The canton of Bavilliers is an administrative division of the Territoire de Belfort department, northeastern France. It was created at the French canton reorganisation which came into effect in March 2015. Its seat is in Bavilliers.

It consists of the following communes:
Bavilliers 
Cravanche
Danjoutin
Essert
Pérouse

References

Cantons of the Territoire de Belfort